This is a list of sovereign states and other territories by population, with population figures estimated for 2010 (rounded to the nearest 1,000). The figures are estimates for the Organization for Economic Cooperation and Development (OECD) "2010 annual statistics", which lists countries and territories with population over 100,000.

Some figures for population density and for area have not yet been added to the table.

The list includes all sovereign states and dependent territories recognized by the United Nations plus the territory under the effective control of the Republic of China (Taiwan).

This list adopts definitions of "country" on a case by case basis. The United Kingdom is considered as a single country while constituent countries of the Kingdom of the Netherlands are regarded separately.

* Change in position from 2005

Notes

External links

2010
2010-related lists